"Breathe" is a song by French artist Feder. The song has peaked at number 10 on the French Singles Chart.

Charts

References

2018 singles
2017 songs
French pop songs